This is a list of airports in Mongolia, grouped by type and sorted by location.

Airports
Airport names shown in bold indicate the airport has scheduled service on commercial airlines.

Former airport

See also
Transport in Mongolia
List of airports by ICAO code: Z#ZM - Mongolia
Wikipedia:WikiProject Aviation/Airline destination lists: Asia#Mongolia

References
Mongolian Civil Aviation Authority (MCAA)

 - includes IATA codes
Great Circle Mapper: Airports in Mongolia - IATA and ICAO codes
World Aero Data: Airports in Mongolia - ICAO codes

External links

Civil Aviation Authority of Mongolia
Aeronautical Information Publication

 
Airports
Mongolia
Mongolia
Airports